Houshang Moradi Kermani (also Romanized as "Hūshang Morādi-e Kermāni"; born 7 September 1944 at Sirch, a village in Kerman Province, Iran) is an Iranian writer best known for children's and young adult fiction. He was a finalist in 2014 for the Hans Christian Andersen Award.

Moradi Kermani was born in Sirch, a village in Kerman Province, and was educated in Sirch, Kerman, and Tehran.

Several Iranian movies and TV series have been made based on his books. In 2006, Dariush Mehrjui directed Mehman-e Maman based on Moradi Kermani's novel with the same title.

Some of Moradi Kermani's books have been translated into English, Esperanto, German, French, Spanish, Dutch, Arabic, and Armenian. His auto-biography was published by Moin Publishers in 2005, entitled "You're No Stranger Here" (Shoma ke gharibe nistid).

He has won  the Hans Christian Andersen, Honorary diploma (1992) and University of San Francisco book of the year (2000).

Houshang Moradi Kermani is a 2018 candidate for the Astrid Lindgren award.

Selected works 
 The Tales of Majid (Ghesseh-ha-ye Majid) translated by Caroline Croskery
 The Boot (Chakmeh)
 The Palm (Nakhl) translated by Caroline Croskery
 The Tandoor (Tanour)
 The Water Urn (Khomreh) translated by Caroline Croskery
 Mommy's Guest (Mehman-e maaman)
 Fist on Hide (Mosht bar poust)
 You're No Stranger Here (Shoma ke gharibe nistid) translated by Caroline Croskery
 A Sweet Jam (Moraba ye Shirin;) translated by Caroline Croskery

References

External links
  

1944 births
Iranian children's writers
Iranian male short story writers
Living people
People from Kerman Province
Members of the Academy of Persian Language and Literature
Crystal Simorgh for Best Screenplay winners
Iranian Science and Culture Hall of Fame recipients in Literature and Culture